Jacques Guérin (23 June 1902 - 6 August 2000) was a French industrialist. For many years he successfully headed up the D'Orsay Parfumerie business after inheriting it in 1936 from his remarkable mother, Jeanne Louise Guérin. Beyond the world of commerce Jacques Guérin is better known by many as a passionate collector of books and manuscripts. One reviewer, paraphrasing the sentiments of several commentators, has described him as "not just a collector but a rescuer of all things Proustian".

Biography

Provenance and early years
Jacques Guérin was born in Paris. His mother was Jeanne Louise Guérin, a businesswoman, art collector and socialite, who in 1916 would team up with the retail magnate Théophile Bader to acquire a failing perfumery business. She turned it around:  by 1931 there is no mention in sources of Théophile Bader's involvement, but a new factory had been built at Puteaux-sur-Seine and there were five million bottles of perfume being sold annually. The enterprise had its own printing house and its own packaging design studio. At the time of her sons' births Jeanne Louise Guérin was in a childless marriage, and had separated from Jules Giraud, her husband, in 1900. Her divorce came much later. The father of Jacques Guérin, Israel Gaston Monteux (1853-1927), was also an art collector, socialite and wealthy industrialist who ran an international chain of shoe shops ("Chaussures Raoul"). One source described him as Jeanne Louise Guérin's companion. Jacques Guérin was acutely sensitive to the stigma that accompanied his illegitimacy, and grew up believing that it was on account of this stigma that he grew up away from his mother, living with his brother, Jean, under the guardianship of their nanny on the outskirts of Paris. According to at least one source Jacques Guérin blamed his father for his illegitimacy and nursed an implacable hatred towards him on account of it.   Nevertheless, it is reported elsewhere that while they were growing up Jacques and Jean Guérin saw both their mother and their father *on a regular basis*. Jacques Guérin was convinced that his parents were deeply in love with each other, and when his father's wife died in 1924 he tried to persuade his parents to marry each other. In this enterprise he failed.

Passion for books
Jacques Guérin discovered his passion for rare books and authors' manuscripts while he was still young. He was just eighteen when he made his first "collectable" purchase, a first edition of "L'Hérésiarque et Cie", a volume of short stories by a then unknown author called Guillaume Apollinaire. He paid just 13 francs for it. Although his childhood may have been emotionally deprived, money worries may have been a more transient problem. He later reminisced: "During my military service at Remiremont (Vosges), I would return to my little room, and opening my suitcase take out Lautréamont like a carefully concealed mistress. It was my luxury, my joy. I had a case made [for it] by a bookbinder in the town".

While still a young man, he was sent by his mother to study Chemistry at the University of Toulouse. It seems already to have been assumed that one day he would take over the perfumery business from his mother. While walking with a friend near the Garonne he recognised  Apel·les Fenosa and called out in greeting.  (They had already been introduced through a mutual friend.) During his time at Toulouse, Guérin befriended the sculptor:  he later became a major collector of Fenosa's work. On his return from Toulouse he worked alongside his mother, thereby acquiring an impressively thorough knowledge of the business.

Among his more notable acquisitions, in 1928 Guérin purchased from Jean Cocteau the original manuscripts for Le Diable au corps and Le Bal du comte d'Orgel by Raymond Radiguet. He subsequently purchased a number of the notebooks containing the hand-written drafts for Proust's iconic seven-volume novel À la recherche du temps perdu (identified sometimes as the "Guérin notebooks" / "Cahiers Guérin") as well as letters from the author to Marthe Amiot (the author's widowed sister-in-law), photographs, and the first set of corrected proofs for "Du côté de chez Swann", the first of the seven volumes. Guérin evidently inherited from both his parents a talent for networking across the artistic beau monde of the times, notably in Guérin's case among leading literary figures. Friends included Erik Satie, Picasso, Maurice Rostand, Madeleine and Marcelin Castaing, Maurice Sachs, Jean Cocteau, Colette, Glenway Wescott and René Béhaine. His circle also included Djuna Barnes, Mireille Havet, Chaïm Soutine, Abel Bonnard and Édouard Vuillard.

Perfumes magnate
By 1936 Jeanne Louise Guérin had managed repay all her investors. It was therefore unencumbered by share-holders or lenders that in 1936 Jacques Guérin took over as controlling director at Maison D'Orsay, guiding the business successfully through the turbulent decades that ensued, and retiring only in 1982. Guérin now divided his time between his Paris apartment along the Rue Murillo, the factory complex at Puteaux-sur-Seine and, after he purchased it in 1947, his country estate at Luzarches, just outside Paris on the city's north side.

A number of the perfumes created under his direction resonated positively with customers. Several friends from Guérin's circle were able to share in his commercial success, notably René Lalique who created perfume bottles for the business.

Violette Leduc
In September 1947 Jacques Guérin was introduced by the polymath-author Jean Genet to the young novelist Violette Leduc. He had met Genet earlier that year, having purchased from Genet the manuscript for his latest novel "Querelle of Brest" in March 1947. They became close friends, and Guérin subsequently received several other Genet manuscripts not through purchase, but as gifts. Genet arranged for Jacques Guérin to meet Leduc after he had expressed his admiration for her autobiographical first novel, "L'Asphyxie", which had been published the previous year. The theme of intense childhood unhappiness which is central to "L'Asphyxie" quickly created a bond of shared experiences between Guérin and  Leduc. When Genet brought Guérin round to Leduc's studio to introduce the two of them, the attraction was immediate and intense.  It was the start of a close friendship. However, Leduc's romantic love for Guérin, though persistent, went unrequited. He preferred men. The result was a mutual closeness that was "faithful but difficult". Jacques Guérin also became Violette Leduc's patron-sponsor, later paying for the production of luxury editions of two of her novels, "L'Affamée" (loosely, ""The famished one) (which she dedicated to him) and Thérèse et Isabelle (which she also dedicated to him). The second of these books was a short novel of just 128 pages (as eventually published), intended as the first part of a longer work. Production was blocked by her publisher who feared its sexual candour would create unacceptable levels of difficulty, however. In the end Jacques Guérin arranged for the novel's private publication in 1955/56, albeit still heavily censored, and with only 28 copies printed.

The collector
Throughout this period Guérin found time to pursue his passion for collecting books and manuscripts. In 1953 he acquired Rimbaud's manuscript for Une Saison en Enfer ("A season in hell") from Henri Matarasso. Matarasso was one of a relatively small number of Paris book-sellers to whose premises Guérin returned regularly over many years, and who no doubt learned to accommodate and anticipate his tastes and preferences. That is no doubt one of several reasons why Jacques Guérin became widely respected in literary circles as a man with an uncanny gift for finding "rare pearls of literature", albeit often at the cost of lengthy meticulous searches in which he evidently took great delight. Even where he appeared to have paid a high price for an item, it often turned out twenty or thirty years later that he had actually snapped up a remarkable bargain.

The collection reached its greatest extent in 1982. At that point Jacques Guérin's library contained more than 2,000 items, ranging from Montaigne to Genet and included the original eight-volume edition of Molière. Whether his collection is judged by extent, quality or value, Jacques Guérin was undoubtedly one of the great twentieth century collectors of French books and manuscripts.

Proust
In 1929 Jacques Guérin fell ill with Appendicitis. The solution was an operation, which was successfully performed by the eminent Paris physician Professor Robert Proust, younger brother of the writer Marcel Proust (who had died in 1922). Jacques Guérin was frequently commended by friends and admirers for his perfect manners, and a few weeks after the operation he paid his doctor a visit in order to thank him. At the doctor's home he was astonished to find that much the place appeared to have been turned into a "sanctuary-repository" celebrating the doctor's late brother:  the author's papers were stacked everywhere and, more surprisingly, furniture inherited from Marcel Proust filled every available space. It was widely known that the Proust brothers had never been close. Some sources suggest that Robert Proust (possibly at his wife's prompting) had been reluctant to dispose of his brother's papers and furniture for reasons of "family honor". The Naples-born writer-journalist (and Proust obsessive) Lorenza Foschini later speculated to an interviewer that the doctor was badly shaken by his brother's death, the experience being intensified by Marcel Proust's refusal to receive his brother as he lay dying in his darkened bedroom:  "...[perhaps] the doctor felt remorse at not having understood in time what a great writer Marcel was, and at not having treated him with due consideration".

In 1935, despite still being only 57, Robert Proust also died. His home was still filled with the papers and furniture inherited more than ten years earlier from his famous elder brother. Marthe Proust (born Marthe Dubois-Amiot), the doctor's widow, had always hated her brother-in-law. Several sources impute her hatred of Marcel Proust to his sexuality. Proust's biographer describes Marthe contemptuously as "a bourgeois woman so typical of the period. But some of her attitudes of fear towards what is different can still be seen today in so many people, and not only towards homosexuals but also toward foreigners, immigrants, for example." Foschini's hostility to the widow (whom she can never have met) may have been sharpened by her understanding that Marthe Proust had "burnt all of Marcel’s papers in order to destroy any evidence of his homosexuality. She did not care that her brother[-in-law] was a genius. The only thing that mattered to her was the dignity of the family." Most sources are strikingly less precise over how much of the Marcel Proust literary legacy was destroyed. Others make it obvious that much survived. Part of the explanation seems to be that Suzy Mante-Proust, the only daughter of Robert and Marthe Proust, acquired many of her uncle's manuscripts and associated literary documentation. By the time Marthe Proust moved out of the family home she had shared with her husband and daughter, Suzy had also removed much of the heavy furniture which her Uncle Marcel had accumulated in the large Paris apartment (in which, during his later decades, he seems largely to have restricted his own occupancy to the cork-lined bedroom). Also, at some stage, Marthe evidently tired of her bonfires and simply asked Werner, a man whom she had come across who remains a mystery figure, to remove the remaining papers. Regardless of how they had survived the widow's incendiary wrath, piles of Marcel Proust's papers ended being delivered by Werner to an antique bookshop in the (then as now fashionable) Rue du Faubourg Saint-Honoré. The bookshop was run by Henri Lefebvre:  and Jacques Guérin was a regular customer. According to one source, it was but minutes after Werner had made his delivery that Guérin passed by and spotted a large quantity of still unsorted material in Lefebvre's shop that he had not previously noticed there. These were surviving papers from Marcel Proust:  Guérin purchased the manuscripts, letters and photographs and enquired as to their provenance. He then contacted Werner directly in order to find out if anything else from the Proust literary estate might be available for sale. There was indeed still much more:  although sources imply that Werner extracted "good prices", it is also clear that Jacques Guérin was content with the deals. Together with the papers, there was a large quantity of surviving furniture. Fortunately Jacques Guérin was a rich man with (after 1947) a big house. Less delighted were subsequent collectors and dealers in Marcel Proust memorabilia looking for bargains. Jacques Guérin was a meticulous and persistent collector:  it is difficult to refute the conclusion that he found and purchased everything of any significance or importance that survived of Proust's legacy.

Marcel Proust was very fond of one particular overcoat lined on the inside with oyster fur. It featured, thinly disguised, in his marathon work À la recherche du temps perdu. During his final years, as he became ever more reclusive, the coat remained spread over the blankets on his bed as additional protection from the cold. After he died, it was among his personal effects, and after Marthe Proust made contact with Werner, it passed, with all the other furnishings from Proust's bedchamber, into Werner's collection. Werner accorded it little respect, using it as a "ship's-blanket" for the little boat he kept on the Marne. Its condition deteriorated and the costly lining became infested with insects. Werner was a shrewd businessman, but even he could not bring himself to sell it to Guérin. Instead he gifted it. True to form, Guérin had the coat meticulously restored at great expense. A later generation of enthusiasts determined that Proust's overcoat was among the most important pieces of Proust's legacy. The writer-journalist Lorenza Foschini even made it the focus for a book which she named after it.

Later years 
In 1982 Guérin finally stepped down from the presidency of Orsay. (Some suggest that he might have served the company better had he quit a little sooner.) The next year he organised the first of a succession of manuscript sales from his collection. The  Bibliothèque nationale de France (BnF / "French national library") submitted successful offers on a number of items including the Proust manuscripts. Another of the Guérin collection sales was organised on his behalf by his friend Michel Castaing on 17 November 1998:  it was the eighth. On that occasion, the French state acquired the manuscript of Rimbaud's Une Saison en Enfer ("A season in hell") for a remarkable 2.9 million French francs (NF). Also sold were ten poems signed by Rimbaud and two original letters signed by "Isidore Ducasse". According to a press report of the time, these manuscripts had been believed lost until they appeared in the listing for the sale.

Personal 
For nearly fifty years Jacques Guérin lived with his partner, the Paris milliner Jean Boy (1907-1980), who came originally from Arcachon (Gironde).

Through his half-sister (and his father's daughter), Germaine Monteux, Jacques Guérin was uncle to the Cinematographer François Reichenbach.

Jean Guérin 
Jacques Guérin's younger brother, Jean Guérin (1903-1966) achieved a measure of notability as an artist. In 1991 Jacques gifted his younger brother's collection of paintings to the city of Chartres.

Notes

References 

1902 births
2000 deaths
Businesspeople from Paris
French perfumers
French book and manuscript collectors
French patrons of the arts
French patrons of literature
Marcel Proust
French LGBT businesspeople
Collectors from Paris